Abarema is a neotropical genus in the family Fabaceae. It is native to Brazil, Cuba, and Venezuela.Most of the species can be found in the Amazon Basin and the Guyana Highlands. They have a deep-green fernlike foliage, with bipinnately compound leaves.

Taxonomy
This genus has been proven to be polyphyletic under its previous circumscription. As a result of the genetic evidence, the genera Jupunba and Punjuba were separated from Abarema.

Species
Following the 1996 revision, there are currently about 45 species. In older works, the entire genus is usually included within Pithecellobium.
 Abarema abbottii – Abbott abarema
 Abarema acreana (provisionally placed here)
 Abarema adenophora
 Abarema agropecuaria
 Abarema alexandri – Shadbark abarema
 Abarema alexandri var. alexandri – Typical shadbark abarema; tamarind shadbark (Jamaica)
 Abarema alexandri var. trogana – Troy shadbark abarema; shadbark (Jamaica)
 Abarema aspleniifolia – Spleen-leaved abarema
 Abarema auriculata (Benth.) Barneby & J.W.Grimes – guarango maní
 Abarema barbouriana – Barbour abarema
 Abarema barbouriana var. barbouriana
 Abarema brachystachya
 Abarema callejasii
 Abarema campestris
 Abarema centiflora
 Abarema cochleata
 Abarema cochleata var. moniliformis
 Abarema cochliocarpos – Barbatimo
 Abarema commutata
 Abarema curvicarpa
 Abarema curvicarpa var. rodriguesii
 Abarema ferruginea
 Abarema filamentosa
 Abarema floribunda
 Abarema gallorum
 Abarema ganymedea
 Abarema glauca – Glaucous abarema
 Abarema idiopoda (S.F.Blake) Barneby & J.W.Grimes
 Abarema josephi
 Abarema jupunba – Delmare abarema, crabwood, dalmare, delmare, jumbie head, soapy-soapy; wild tamarin (Grenada, Saint Vincent and the Grenadines)
 Abarema jupunba var. jupunba
 Abarema jupunba var. trapezifolia
 Abarema killipii
 Abarema laeta
 Abarema langsdorfii
 Abarema lehmannii
 Abarema leucophylla
 Abarema leucophylla var. vaupesensis
 Abarema levelii
 Abarema longipedunculata
 Abarema macradenia – Panama abarema
 Abarema microcalyx
 Abarema mataybifolia
 Abarema nipensis
 Abarema obovalis
 Abarema obovata – Obovate abarema
 Abarema oppositifolia – Opposite-leaved abarema
 Abarema oxyphyllidia
 Abarema piresii
 Abarema racemiflora
 Abarema ricoae
 Abarema turbinata
 Abarema villifera
 Abarema zolleriana

Formerly placed here
 Archidendron bigeminum (L.) I.C.Nielsen (as Abarema abeywickramae Kosterm., Abarema bigemina (L.) Kosterm., Abarema monadelpha (Roxb.) Kosterm.)
 Archidendron grandiflorum (Benth.) I.C.Nielsen (as Abarema grandiflora (Benth.) Kosterm.)
 Archidendron hendersonii (F.Muell.) I.C.Nielsen (as Abarema hendersonii (F.Muell.) Kosterm.)
 Jupunba idiopoda  (S.F.Blake) M.V.B.Soares, M.P.Morim & Iganci (as Abarema idiopoda (S.F.Blake) Barneby & J.W.Grimes)

Footnotes

References

  (1996): Silk Tree, Guanacaste, Monkey's Earring: A generic system for the synandrous Mimosaceae of the Americas. Part I. Abarema, Albizia, and Allies. Memoirs of the New York Botanical Garden 74(1): 1–292. 
  (2005): Genus Abarema. Version 10.01, November 2005. Retrieved 2008-MAR-31.

 
Neotropical realm flora
Fabaceae genera